Jay Bontatibus (July 31, 1964 – February 12, 2017) was an American actor.

He was born and raised in Cheshire, Connecticut. He was active in sports at Cheshire High School and at Central Connecticut State University. While at the latter, he also developed an interest in acting.

In 1998, Bontatibus joined the cast of The Young and the Restless, in the role of Tony Viscardi; he departed the cast in 2000. He also played Andy Capelli in General Hospital (2002-2004) and Rob McCullough in Days of Our Lives (2008).

He was also married to the soap's then-casting director, Marnie Saitta, from 2002 to 2005.

Bontatibus died on February 12, 2017, following a battle with cancer.

Television credits
These include:
The Young and the Restless as Tony Viscardi
General Hospital as Andy Capelli
Port Charles as Detective Andy Capelli
numerous guest appearances on programmes such as Cold Case, CSI: Miami, Walker, Texas Ranger, Sabrina, the Teenage Witch, V.I.P., Drake & Josh, and Another World.

Movie credits
These include Laws of Gambling as Joey, Lords of the Underworld as Johnny, and I Love You Came Too Late as Scott Donovan.

References

External links

1964 births
2017 deaths
People from Cheshire, Connecticut
Male actors from Connecticut
American male television actors
American male film actors
Deaths from cancer in California
Cheshire High School alumni
Central Connecticut State University alumni